This is a list of Live with Regis and Kelly episodes which were broadcast during the show's 20th season.  The list is ordered by air date.

Although the co-hosts may have read a couple of emails during the broadcast, it does not necessarily count as a "Regis and Kelly Inbox" segment.

September 2007

October 2007

November 2007

December 2007

January 2008

February 2008

March 2008

April 2008

May 2008

June 2008

July 2008

August 2008

See also
 Live with Regis and Kelly (season 18)
 Live with Regis and Kelly (season 19)
 Live with Regis and Kelly (season 21)
 Live with Regis and Kelly (season 22)

References

2007 American television seasons
2008 American television seasons